Darvish Khan (Gholam Hossein Darvish; 1872 – 22 November 1926) was a Persian classical musician and a tar player.

Biography

Darvish Khan was born in Tehran.

His teachers included his father and Aqa Hossein-Qoli Farahani. He was a member of the Aziz Soltan music group. Later, he attended the Dar ol-Fonoon Music School. 

He played a concert at the Grand Hotel of Tehran with other great masters of Persian music of his time, including Aref Qazvini. Darvish left for London and Tbilisi to record.   

He died at the age of 54, on 22  November 1926, in an accident. His carriage was hit by a lorry automobile which was very rare at that time. It is said that he was the first Iranian to be killed in a car accident.

See also 
Music of Iran
 List of Iranian musicians

References

External links
A biography
biography
 from Rouhollah Khaleghi Artistic Center / Kanun-e Honari-e Rouhollah Khaleghi

1872 births
1926 deaths
Musicians from Tehran
Iranian tar players
Road incident deaths in Iran
People of Qajar Iran
19th-century Iranian musicians
20th-century Iranian musicians